Neram Pularumbol is a 1986 Indian Malayalam-language film, directed and produced by K. P. Kumaran. The film stars  Mammootty, Mohanlal, Ramya Krishnan and KPAC Lalitha in the lead roles. The film has musical score by Johnson. It was the Malayalam debut of Ramya Krishnan. Although this was her first film during the shoot, her first release happened to be in Tamil through the film, Vellai Manasu (1984).

Cast

Mammootty as Brother Lawrence
Mohanlal as Godfree
Ramya Krishnan as Nancy
KPAC Lalitha
Sreenivasan
Bharath Gopi Father of Nancy
Nahas
Idavela Babu
Jalaja 
Kannur Sreelatha
Kuttyedathi Vilasini
Nanditha Bose
P. K. Abraham as Vicar of Church

Soundtrack
The music was composed by Johnson and the lyrics were written by O. N. V. Kurup.

References

External links
 

1986 films
1980s Malayalam-language films